Jean-Baptiste Faure (15 January 1830 – 9 November 1914) was a French operatic baritone and art collector who also composed several classical songs.

Singing career
Faure was born in Moulins. A choirboy in his youth, he entered the Paris Conservatory in 1851 and made his operatic debut the following year at the Opéra-Comique, as Pygmalion in Victor Massé's Galathée. He remained at the Opéra-Comique for over seven years, singing baritone roles such as Max in Adolphe Adam's Le chalet and Michel in Thomas's Le caïd. During this time he also created the Marquis d'Erigny in Auber's Manon Lescaut (1856) and Hoël in Meyerbeer's Le pardon de Ploërmel (1859; later known as Dinorah), among seven premieres at that house.

He made his debut at the Royal Opera House, London, in 1860 as Hoël, and at the Paris Opera in 1861. He would sing at the Opera every season until 1869 and then again in 1872-76 and 1878. In addition, he continued to perform off and on in London until 1877 at venues such as Her Majesty's Theatre and the Theatre Royal, Drury Lane.

Among the many operas in which he appeared in Paris were Wolfgang Amadeus Mozart's Don Giovanni as well as L'étoile du nord, Les Huguenots and La favorite.

He also made history by creating several important operatic roles written by such prominent composers as Giacomo Meyerbeer, Giuseppe Verdi and Ambroise Thomas. They included the leading baritone parts in  L'Africaine, Don Carlos and Hamlet (in 1865, 1867, and 1868 respectively).

His last stage appearances are recorded as taking place in Marseilles and Vichy in 1886.

Voice
Faure possessed a dark, smooth yet flexible baritone voice, which he used with impeccable skill and taste. He was a sophisticated interpretive artist, too, and all these accomplishments combined to make him one of the most significant figures to have appeared on the French musical stage during the 19th century. He wrote two books on singing, La Voix et le Chant (1886) and Aux Jeunes Chanteurs (1898), and also taught at the Paris Conservatory from 1857 to 1860.

The greatest of Faure's French heirs were the lyric bass Pol Plançon (1851-1914)—who modelled his vocal method directly on that of Faure—and Jean Lassalle (1847-1909), who succeeded Faure as principal baritone at the Paris Opera. Both Plançon and Lassalle made a number of recordings during the early 1900s, and their cultivated performances for the gramophone preserve key elements of Faure's singing style and technique.

Two non-commercial—and possibly unique—brown wax cylinders exist that are thought to be private recordings of Faure singing at around 70 years of age. Though there is no specific documentation of these recordings, one—a rendition of "Jardins de l'Alcazar... Léonor! viens" from Donizetti's La favorite—begins with an announcement (from either the singer or the (Pathé) recording engineer): "Le grand air du baryton!" Pathé and other French recordings from this era nearly always began with an announcement such as "Le sérénade de Don Juan, de Mozart, chanté par [baryton Jean] Lassalle, de l'Opéra!". The affectionate honorific in the supposed Faure cylinder recording only makes sense for a man of advanced years who is so beloved, celebrated, and revered by a general public that he need not even be named. The proliferation of documentation about Faure's standing as such points wholly and only to him. The choice of aria is almost certainly a clue as to the authenticity of the recording, as well. Alphonse of La favorite was one of Faure's most important roles—one with which he toured the provinces of France in 1877, just after his retirement from the stage. He gained enormous critical and popular notoriety from those who hadn't had a chance to hear him in Paris or London. His performances of this role would have left a lasting impression on the public and the press, and the aria was likely chosen for recording as an allusion to that time. A sampling of writing about Faure in this role and specifically this recitative and aria:

Other achievements
In addition, Faure composed several enduring songs, including a "Sancta Maria", "Les Rameaux" ("The Palms") and "Crucifix". (These latter two songs were recorded by Enrico Caruso, among others.) "Les Rameaux" was translated into English by Helen Tretbar.  In 1876 he dedicated his valse-légende "Stella" to his sometime leading lady at the Paris Opéra, Gabrielle Krauss.

An avid collector of impressionist art, Faure sat for multiple portraits by Édouard Manet and owned 67 canvases by that painter, including the masterpiece Le déjeuner sur l'herbe and The Fifer. He also owned Le pont d'Argenteuil and 62 other works by Claude Monet. Part of his collection (which also contained paintings by Degas, Sisley, Pissarro, Ingres and Prud'hon) was kept at his villa "Les Roches" in Étretat, whose famous cliffs he commissioned Claude Monet to paint 40 times.

Faure died of natural causes in Paris in 1914, during the early months of World War I. According to his obituary in the New York Times, he had been made an officer of the Légion d'honneur. He was married to the singer Constance Caroline Lefèbvre (1828-1905).

Roles 
This list of known roles contains duplicates where Faure sang in an alternate language. Years indicate the debut of the role into his repertoire.

References

External links

 
 Portraits of Faure at Gallica
 , November 11, 1914.

 Sheet music for Les Rameaux
 Sheet music for Crucifix
 J. Fauré recordings at the Discography of American Historical Recordings.

1830 births
1914 deaths
19th-century classical composers
19th-century French male opera singers
Academic staff of the Conservatoire de Paris
French art collectors
French Romantic composers
French male composers
French operatic baritones
Officiers of the Légion d'honneur
People from Moulins, Allier